Ahmadabad Rural District is a rural district (dehestan) in the Central District of Firuzabad County, Fars Province, Iran. At the 2006 census, its population was 15,919, in 3,458 families.  The rural district has 45 villages.

References 

Rural Districts of Fars Province
Firuzabad County